Charles M. Brinckerhoff (March 15, 1901 – April 22, 1987) was an American engineer and businessman who was formerly the chairman and CEO of Anaconda Copper, the world's largest producer of copper. He was a recipient of the Hoover Medal and the William Lawrence Saunders Gold Medal.

Biography 
Brinckerhoff was born on March 15, 1901, in Minnesota and grew up in Elmhurst, Queens. He earned a bachelor's degree from Columbia College in 1922 and a graduate degree in engineering from Columbia School of Mines in 1925.

After graduating from Columbia, he was an engineer for the Phelps Dodge Corporation at Morenci, Arizona. He later felt the need to learn practical mining and joined Inspiration mine as a miner, working his way up to be a foreman, and was made engineer. At Inspiration, he introduced numerous improvements in the practice of caving, which were employed by caving operations throughout the world.

In 1935, he took the position of an assistant mine superintendent at the Potrerillos mine. In 1945, he was made general manager of that operation. From 1945 to 1948, he was general manager of the Chile Exploration Company, which owned the Chuquicamata mine, the largest copper mine in the world. Under his leadership, the production doubled, and the pay for workers at the mine became the third highest in the world.

In the early 1950s, Brinckerhoff was offered to join Southern Peru Copper Corporation as general manager and president. When he tendered his resignation, Clyde Weed, then CEO of Anaconda Copper, revealed that he was destined to success him as CEO of the company. In 1958, Brinckerhoff was promoted president of the parent organization, Anaconda Copper, and in 1964 its chief executive officer.

In 1965, he became chairman of Anaconda Copper, a position he held until his retirement in 1969, ending his 23 year-career in Chile.

After retiring, he was a consultant to the Shah of Iran and helped develop the Sarcheshme Copper Mine. He also took part in the negotiations that led to the "Chilenizacion" of copper mines under President Eduardo Frei Montalva in 1971.

Awards 
In 1956, the Chilean government bestowed upon him the Order of Bernardo O'Higgins, the highest award Chile makes to non-nationals for distinguished service to the country.

In 1961, Columbia School of Engineering and Applied Science awarded Brinckerhoff the Egleston medal, the university's highest award for "distinguished engineering achievement".

Brinckerhoff was also the recipient of the William Lawrence Saunders Gold Medal in 1968, bestowed by the American Institute of Mining, Metallurgical, and Petroleum Engineers for "outstanding administrative and technical ability, and for discerning foresight and leadership in the minerals industry."

In 1979, he was awarded the Hoover Medal for being a "distinguished mining and metallurgical engineer; leader in converting world resources into metals needed by man; expander of the base of higher education; exponent of improved human relations as the basis for industrial advancement; friend of developing countries; diplomat; humanitarian".

Personal life 
Brinckerhoff married Florence Andreen in 1935. They had one daughter, Carol Kietzman. He died of pneumonia on April 22, 1987, at the Lenox Hill Hospital at age 86.

References 

1901 births
1987 deaths
Anaconda Copper
Columbia College (New York) alumni
Columbia School of Mines alumni
People from Minnesota
American chief executives
American chief executives of Fortune 500 companies
American mining businesspeople
American mining engineers
American expatriates in Chile